Wednesbury Town F.C. was the name used for three football clubs based in Wednesbury, West Midlands, England.

Original club

The Wednesbury Football Club, formed in 1873 and playing a form of Sheffield rules at Crankhall Farm, was referred to as both Wednesbury and Wednesbury Town.  From 1877 the club was known as Wednesbury Strollers F.C.

Second club

Although the club claimed a foundation date of 1879, there is no record of the club before 1883.  This incarnation of Town was formed by the reserve side of the Wednesbury Old Athletic F.C., which split from the parent club after a player disagreement, and therefore may have dated its foundation to the first games of the reserve side.

The club's first season was successful.  It entered the FA Cup for the first time in 1883–84 and reached the fourth round.  The club recorded victories over West Bromwich Albion (2–0), Walsall Town (6–0 after a 2–2 draw) and Derby Midland (1–0) before going out in the Fourth Round after a 5–0 defeat by Old Westminsters.

Town also reached the quarter-finals of the Birmingham Senior Cup in 1883-84, losing 5-3 to Aston Villa at the Aston Lower Grounds.

The club's finest moment however came towards the end of the season, when it won the Wednesbury Charity Cup, beating some of the best sides in the Midlands; the Old Athletic by 4-0, Birmingham St George's 3-1, Walsall Swifts 3-0, and, in the final, Nottingham Forest 3-0, after a replay.

The following season was less successful.  The club went out of the FA Cup and Birmingham Senior Cup by 4-1 defeats to Aston Villa, in the first round in the former tournament and the third round of the latter.  En route to the third round the club beat the Strollers, who were of course formerly Wednesbury Town, 5-0.

The final match of the club seems to have been a 5-1 defeat at Leek F.C. in March 1885.  At the end of the 1884-85 season, the club merged back with Wednesbury Old Alliance, its players joining the Old Uns' set-up.

Honours

Wednesbury Charity Cup
Winners: 1883-84

Third club

A new club was formed in 2002, which was admitted into the West Midlands (Regional) League Division One North.  The team played at Long Lane Park, Long Lane, Essington, Wolverhampton where they shared a pitch with Riverway.

For the 2008–09 season, they were members of the West Midlands (Regional) League Division One, but resigned during the season.

References

External links
Pyramid passion website
WMRL website
Club website
Wednesbury Town on Football Club History Database

Defunct football clubs in England
Association football clubs established in 2002
Sport in Sandwell
Wednesbury
2002 establishments in England
Defunct football clubs in the West Midlands (county)
Association football clubs disestablished in 2009
West Midlands (Regional) League
Association football clubs established in 1875
1875 establishments in England
Defunct football clubs in Staffordshire
Association football clubs disestablished in 1885